Pleasant Valley School District #364 is a school district in the U.S. state of Idaho. serving the greater Pleasant Valley in Owyhee County, Idaho, in one school, Pleasant Valley Elementary School. Its administrative offices are located in Jordan Valley, Oregon.

As of the 2018–19 school year, the District had an average daily attendance of 5.69 students.

References

External links
 

School districts in Idaho
Education in Owyhee County, Idaho